This is a list of town tramway systems in Portugal. It includes all tram systems in Portugal, past and present; cities with currently operating systems, and those systems themselves, are indicated in bold and blue background colored rows. The use of the diamond (♦) symbol indicates where there were (or are) two or more independent tram systems operating concurrently within a single metropolitan area.  Those tram systems that operated on other than standard gauge track (where known) are indicated in the 'Notes' column.

See also
 Trams in Portugal
 List of town tramway systems in Europe
 List of tram and light rail transit systems
 List of metro systems

References

Bibliography
Books and periodicals shown in List of town tramway systems

 
Portugal
Tram